General elections were held in Mexico on July 6, 1924. Plutarco Elías Calles won the presidential elections with 84.1% of the vote.

Results

President

References

Presidential elections in Mexico
Mexico
General
July 1924 events
Election and referendum articles with incomplete results